Kadom is an urban locality (an urban-type settlement) and the administrative center of Kadomsky District of Ryazan Oblast, Russia, located on the Moksha River  from Ryazan. Population:

History
It has been known since 1209. It had town status until 1926, when it was demoted to a rural locality. Urban-type settlement status was granted to it in 1958.

Economy
Kadom is home to Kadomsky veniz, which manufactures embroidery goods.  There is also a woodworking and a dairy processing plant in the settlement.

References

Sources

External links
Unofficial website of Kadom 
Website of Kadomsky veniz 

Volga Finns
Urban-type settlements in Ryazan Oblast
Temnikovsky Uyezd